El dolor de pagar la renta is a 1960 Mexican comedy film directed Agustín P. Delgado.

Cast
Marco Antonio Campos as Viruta
Gaspar Henaine as Capulina
Cesáreo Quezadas as Juanito
Lilia Guízar as Lulu
Norma Lazareno as Cristina
Rose Cué as Martita
Miguel Suárez as Don Próspero
Mercedes Ruffino as Robusta
Tito Novaro as Patiño
Celia Viveros as Doña Chole
Amparo Arozamena as Duquesa
Julián de Meriche as El sordo Tapia
Jorge Casanova as Policeman
Armando Acosta as Policeman
Guillermo Hernández as Lulu's Uncle
Miguel Córcega as Paco

External links

1960 films
Mexican comedy films
1960s Spanish-language films
Films with screenplays by Roberto Gómez Bolaños
1960s Mexican films